Sirius Minerals plc was a fertilizer development company based in the United Kingdom. It was listed on the London Stock Exchange until it was acquired by Anglo American in March 2020.

History
Founded in 2003, the company initially focused on exploring the potential for potash mining in North Dakota. However, after abandoning attempts at overseas exploration in February 2012 and following approval from the North York Moors National Park Authority in June 2015, the then AIM-listed company stated that it would seek financing in order to begin construction at the Woodsmith Mine in North Yorkshire. It was admitted to the main market in April 2017.

In September 2019 the Woodsmith Mine project was in doubt when the company shelved a £400 million junk bond sale, citing a lack of government support and Brexit uncertainty. In November 2019 the company announced that it was in talks with potential investors to raise $600 million needed to fund the first phase of the development.

In January 2020 Anglo American confirmed it was considering making a bid to buy Sirius, making a 5.5p per share offer to buy the project for £400m. In salvaging the financially troubled project, Anglo American envisages spending around £230m to keep construction going through to at least 2022. Sirius advised shareholders that if the offer was rejected then the company could face administration within weeks. Subject to approval by at least 75% of Sirius shareholders, the deal was expected to become effective by 31 March 2020. The sale was approved by shareholders on 4 March 2020.

Operations
The Company’s stated focus is the development of its North Yorkshire polyhalite project which aims to exploit the world’s largest deposit of polyhalite, a type of potash. The area of interest is located on the Yorkshire coast, mostly within the North York Moors National Park.

The company announced the material findings of the project's definitive feasibility study on 17 March 2016. In summary it proposes a framework for production capacity of 20 million tonnes per annum ("Mtpa") with initial installed capacity of 10Mtpa. This will deliver a £2.3 billion annual contribution to the UK's GDP, £2.5 billion of annual exports which represents a 7% decrease in the UK's trade deficit and 2,500 direct and indirect production jobs as well as over 2,000 jobs during construction.

References

External links
www.siriusminerals.com

Fertiliser companies of the United Kingdom
Companies based in the Borough of Scarborough
Mining companies of the United Kingdom